The Illinois Department of Mines and Minerals' Springfield Mine Rescue Station is a historic mine rescue station located at 609 Princeton Avenue in Springfield, Illinois. Built in 1910–11, the station was the first dedicated institution established by any state to help prevent and recover from mining disasters. It trained both miners and dedicated rescue workers in proper safety procedures and emergency preparedness. The station was added to the National Register of Historic Places on July 5, 1985.

History
Illinois was a major coal-producing state at the turn of the 20th century, and the rapid growth of its mining industry came with increased safety risks for miners. The 1909 Cherry Mine disaster, which claimed the lives of 259 miners, drew attention and public sentiment to the need for mining safety provisions. In response to the disaster, the Illinois government passed legislation to authorize the establishment of three mine rescue stations, one in each region of the state. The Springfield station served Central Illinois, while stations in LaSalle and Benton served the northern and southern thirds respectively. Construction on the stations began in 1910; the Springfield station was completed in January 1911, shortly before the other two, making it the first dedicated mine rescue station in the United States. In 1914, the state supplemented its efforts with three new stations in Herrin, Harrisburg, and Du Quoin.

The station served two main purposes: to train miners in proper safety procedures and to train special teams of rescuers who could respond to future mining emergencies. Its facilities included classrooms for training, including a special room that could simulate a smoke-filled mine, and living space for the rescue workers. A garage was added to the station in 1948 to accommodate the state's first mobile rescue unit, which allowed rescue workers to respond much more quickly to emergencies. The station continues to train miners and rescue workers; it is the northernmost of the four stations still in operation.

References

Government buildings on the National Register of Historic Places in Illinois
Buildings and structures completed in 1911
Buildings and structures in Springfield, Illinois
Mining in Illinois
Coal mining in the United States
National Register of Historic Places in Springfield, Illinois